Sun Gun Telescope, as featured in the August 1999 issue of Scientific American magazine, was designed so that large groups of people can view the sun safely - in particular it was created as a way to encourage children to become interested in astronomy.  With this safe and portable device, both amateur science enthusiasts and professionals alike can observe sun spots.

Bruce Hegerberg designed the Sun Gun from a 60 mm diameter 900 mm fl. optical tube which is mounted inside a 3-inch PVC which is in turn connected to a 20-inch plastic flower planter.  A rear projection screen is then mounted on the top of the flower planter.  The entire Sun Gun can be made from items easily found at most local hardware stores.  The scope itself is an inexpensive 60mm refractor available from many sources.

See also
 List of telescope types

References 

 Sun of a Gun featured in Scientific American 
 "Training Squadron adds new scope to training." USAF
 Sun Gun ready for its starring role at Philly solar eclipse party The Philadelphia Inquirer article August 20, 2017
 Sun of a Gun Scientific American Vol. 281, No. 2 (AUGUST 1999), pp. 88-89 by Shawn Carlson
 Rebuilding Education Scientific American Vol. 281, No. 5 (NOVEMBER 1999) by Wolfgang Benedek
 Supporting Cyber School Scientific American Vol. 281, No. 5 (NOVEMBER 1999) by Bonnie White
 Eclipse Day Activities the Smithsonian Institute National Air and Space Museum's Sun Gun

External links 
 Original Sun Gun web site
 Sun Gun web site
Telescope types
Scientific American